Raimund Harmstorf (7 October 1939 – 3 May 1998) was a German actor. He became famous as the protagonist of a German TV mini series based on Jack London's the Sea-Wolf (which was sold into many countries) and starred later on successfully in another German TV series based on Jules Verne's Michael Strogoff.

Life 
Harmstorf was the son of a doctor from Hamburg. He started a sports career and soon became a regional master of the decathlon. He then studied medicine, later music and performing arts. From the beginning of the 1960s he started performing in smaller TV productions. His breakthrough was in 1971 with the TV series Der Seewolf, based on Jack London's novel The Sea-Wolf, where he played the evil-minded Captain Larsen. Later he played in several spaghetti westerns along with Bud Spencer, Franco Nero and Charlton Heston.

Death 
Toward the end of his career he was affected by Parkinson's disease and weakened by a regimen of heavy medication. His illness and vulnerability was greatly exploited by the tabloids. He committed suicide by hanging himself. His death caused a scandal.

German tabloids were investigated; German police consequently stated that Harmstorf's suicide had been substantially promoted by certain articles. In particular Bild was blamed because Bild  had already published Harmstorf's suicide on its main page before his actual death. Harmstorf's girlfriend confirmed that the actor had obviously already been dismayed after he had read this article, even before the news had been partly quoted on Germany's popular TV channel RTL Television.

Filmography 
The following is a selection of Harmstorf's roles in film:

1969: Donnerwetter! Donnerwetter! Bonifatius Kiesewetter - Stramm, Polizeileutnant
1971:  - Siegfried
1971:  (TV Mini-Series) - Wolf Larsen
1972: Semesterferien (TV Series) - Paul, ein Tramper
1972: Bloody Friday - Heinz Klett
1972: Cry of the Black Wolves - Jack Harper
1972: The Call of the Wild - Pete
1973: Der Seewolf - Wolf Larsen
1973: White Fang - Kurt Jansen
1974: Challenge to White Fang - Kurt Jansen
1975: Michel Strogoff (TV Mini-Series) - Michael Strogoff
1975: A Genius, Two Partners and a Dupe - Sergeant Milton
1975: Derrick (Season 2, Episode 5: "Zeichen der Gewalt") - Günter Hausmann
1977: California - Rope Whittaker
1978: Mr. Mean - Rommell
1978: The Inglorious Bastards - German soldier Adolf Sachs
1978: Lo chiamavano Bulldozer - Sergeant Kempfer
1979: Goetz von Berlichingen of the Iron Hand - Götz von Berlichingen
1979: The Sheriff and the Satellite Kid - Capt. Briggs
1979: Derrick (Season 6, Episode 6: "Tandem") - Rudolf Nolde
1980: L'empreinte des géants - Jo Hansen
1980:  - Schiffskapitän
1983: S.A.S. à San Salvador - Enrique Chacon
1983:  (TV film) - Anton Kameter
1983: Thunder Warrior - Deputy Barry Henson
1984: Man Hunt - Robson
1985: Das Wunder - Raphaela's Father
1986: Geld oder Leber! - Kapitän der 'Klagenfurt'
1987: Thunder Warrior II - Deputy Rusty Weissner
1987–1988: The Black Forest Clinic (TV Series) - Cousin Florian
1990:  - Mr. Whiteman
1992–1994: African Skies (TV series) - Raimund
1995: The Viking Sagas - Valgard
1996: The Wolves - King
1997: Blutrausch - Profi

External links 
 
 Raimund Harmstorf on a page dedicated to Italian western films
 Fanpage

References 

1939 births
1998 deaths
Male actors from Hamburg
German male film actors
German male television actors
Male Spaghetti Western actors
20th-century German male actors
People with Parkinson's disease
1998 suicides
Suicides by hanging in Germany